BMA Cup was an exhibition competition organized by Hong Kong First Division League football club South China on 23 February 2007 and they played against the guest team Yokohama F. Marinos of J. League.

South China won by an aggregate 6-5 after penalty shootout.

Ticketing
Tickets to the match were not sold as the HKFA stated that the match date was too close to 2007 Lunar New Year Cup. Instead, tickets were allocated to different organizations especially South China Football Fan Club. Each member of the fan club was allowed to obtain two tickets of the match. Those who bought a two-day ticket for the 2007 Lunar New Year Cup were also able to receive a ticket to the match.

Pre-match
There was a pre-match of SCAA 92/93 Invitation Team vs SCAA Elite Youth before the main exhibition match. This pre-match took the form of 30 minutes per half while the main match took the usual 45 minutes per half. SCAA 92/93 Invitation Team won 2–0 against SCAA Elite Youth with both goals scored by Anto Grabo.

Squads
SCAA 92/93 Invitation Team
 Leung Cheuk Cheung (梁卓長)
 Chu Yue Tai (朱雨大)
 Leslie Santos (山度士)
 Shum Kwok Pui (岑國培)
 Lee Fuk Wing (李福榮)
 Chan Kwok Hung (陳國雄)
 Lee Yun Wa (李潤華)
 Ku Kam Fai (顧錦輝)
 Au Yeung Ting Tsz (歐陽應慈)
 Law Wai Chi (羅偉志)
 Chan Ping On (陳炳安)
 Pang Kam Chuen (彭錦全)
 Chan Wai Chiu (陳偉超)
 Chiu Chung Man (招重文)
 Anto Grabo (基保)
 Choi York Yee (蔡育瑜)
 Marlon R. Van Der Sander (尹迪辛達)

SCAA Elite Youth
 Chan Wai Kwan (陳煒坤)
 Siu Leong (蕭亮)
 Leung Kong Yiu (梁罡耀)
 Cheng Chi Yin (鄭志賢)
 Lai Man Fei (賴文飛)
 Chan Kin Tung (陳健東)
 Chong Kai Chung (莊啟聰)
 Wong Chi Hung (王志雄)
 Au Fai Tat (歐輝達)
 Cheng Ching Hang (鄭正行)
 Chan Ka Chun (陳嘉晉)
 Leung Ho Chun (梁灝駿)
 Leung Kai Chung (梁啟聰)
 Tang Chi Ho (鄧智浩)
 Lui Kin Chung (呂建忠)
 Cheung Chun Hei (張晉僖)
 Li Chung Yin (李仲賢)
 Ng Ming Hei (吳銘浠)
 Tai Sze Chung (戴思聰)
 Lee Chun Yin (李俊賢)
 Cheung Tsz Fung (張子烽)

Result

Live Broadcasting 
 TV Broadcast: TVB Pearl
 Radio Broadcast: RTHK Radio 1

Trivia 
 South China booked Mong Kok Stadium for Yokohama F. Marinos to have their first training section on arrival date.  A staff thanked SCAA's manager director Steven Lo at the night for providing them "the school football pitch", despite the fact that Mong Kok Stadium is actually the main venue for Hong Kong major football matches.

References 
 HKFA Website Match report
 GoalGoalGoal.com 南華92 2:0 南華精英 (in Chinese)
 Scaafc.com 傳媒報導 - 2007-02-06 Marinos promise top side to take on South China
 Scaafc.com 球迷會會員專區 - 最新發佈！BMA 盃表演賽－南華 vs 橫濱水手詳情介紹及換領入場劵方法 (in Chinese)
 SCAA Official Blog 香港足球資源問題 (in Chinese)

South China AA
2006–07 in Hong Kong football
2007 in Japanese football
2007